Kisoro Airport  is an airport serving the town of Kisoro in Uganda and nearby Bwindi Impenetrable National Park and Mgahinga Gorilla National Park.
It is one of twelve upcountry airports administered by the Civil Aviation Authority of Uganda.

The airport is mainly used by small planes flying tourists on a daily basis to Mgahinga Gorilla National Park, the southern side of Bwindi Impenetrable National Park, as well as connecting onto Queen Elizabeth National Park. As of 2017, the airport does not accommodate international flights. The Civil Aviation Authority of Uganda has hinted on plans of upgrading the Kisoro Airport.

The Kisoro non-directional beacon (Ident: KS) is located on the field.

Airlines and destinations

See also
Transport in Uganda
List of airports in Uganda

References

External links
Kisoro OpenStreetMap
Uganda Civil Aviation Authority Homepage
Kisoro - OurAirports

Airports in Uganda
Kisoro District